Fourwalls is a 2022 Indian Kannada family drama film written and directed by S S Sajjan. The film is produced by T. Vishwanath Naik under SV Pictures Banner. The movie features Achyuth Kumar, Dattanna, Sujay Shastri, Dr.Pavitra, Baskar Ninasam & Dr.Janvi Jyothi in prominent roles. Anand Rajavikram has composed the music and background score, editing by Satish Chandraiah and cinematography by Vadde Devendra Reddy.

Plot 

Shankranna, born in a poor family, moves to the city with his family. His life is filled with many ups and downs that lay between life and death, incidences of success and failure, love and trust, and practices and belief in life.

Cast 

 Achyuth Kumar as Shankranna
 Dattanna as Mavayya
 Sujay Shastri as Ramanna
 Dr.Pavitra as Parvati
 Baskar Ninasam as Surya
 Dr.Janvi Jyothi as Geetha
 Rachana Dashrath as Kumuda
 Shankar Murthy SR as Kumar
 Shreya Shetty as Poorvi
 Anchal as Nandini
 Vikas Naik as Raja
 T Vishwanath Naik as Prakash
 Durgaprasad CS as Koddaddi
 Mahantesh Sajjan 
 Dilip B M as Dilip
 Sanjeeva as Mudre

Production 

The film team released special teaser in August 2021 for Achyuth Kumar birthday. This film marks Achyuth Kumar’s debut as lead actor. The crew had to recreate the 1980s feel for some sequences in the movie. The film team shot at old HMT factory as well around old houses on outskirts of Bengaluru. Natural colors were used, giving the period an authentic touch. The plot of film revolves around love, family, and emotional themes that do not require vivid colors.

Release and reception 

The film was theatrically released on 11 February 2022 and opened to good reviews from critics and audience.

The critic of Times of India wrote that the Fourwalls story will strongly connect with father and daughters especially girls who were raised by a stern father.

Soundtrack 

The film's music and background score is composed by Anand Rajavikram, the retro track Kanmaniye rendered by Vijay Prakash and picturized in 1980s style was a viral hit. The music rights were acquired by Anand Audio.

References

External links 

2022 films
2020s Kannada-language films
2022 drama films
Indian drama films